Vice Admiral Sir Keith Edward Blount,  (born 22 June 1966) is a senior Royal Navy officer and pilot. He was Assistant Chief of Naval Staff (Aviation, Amphibious Capability and Carriers) and head of the Fleet Air Arm from 2015 to 2019. He serves as Commander Allied Maritime Command, NATO, since May 2019.

Early life and education
Blount was born on 22 June 1966 in Plymouth, England. He was educated at Plymstock School, a state secondary school in Plymouth. He holds a Master of Arts degree in Defence Studies.

Naval career

Blount joined the Royal Navy in 1984, and qualified as a helicopter pilot in 1986. Following training, he served with 826, 810, 771, 705 and 820 Naval Air Squadrons. His commands have included , the Iraqi Maritime Task Group, and the United Kingdom's Maritime Component in Bahrain. He was appointed an Officer of the Order of the British Empire in the 2011 Queen's Birthday Honours. 

Blount served as Assistant Chief of Naval Staff (Aviation, Amphibious Capability and Carriers) and Rear Admiral Fleet Air Arm from May 2015 to February 2019. He was elected a Fellow of the Royal Aeronautical Society in 2016, and appointed a Companion of the Order of the Bath in the 2018 New Year Honours. He become Commander Allied Maritime Command, effective 20 May 2019, and was promoted to vice admiral.

From July 2023 he will become Deputy SACEUR in the rank of Admiral.

While a commodore, Blount was awarded the Legion of Merit in the degree of officer by the President of the United States "in recognition of meritorious, gallant and distinguished services during coalition operations in the field".

Blount was appointed Knight Commander of the Order of the Bath (KCB) in the 2023 New Year Honours.

References

 

 
 

|-

1966 births
Military personnel from Plymouth, Devon
Knights Commander of the Order of the Bath
Fellows of the Royal Aeronautical Society
Fleet Air Arm aviators
Living people
Officers of the Order of the British Empire
Royal Navy vice admirals
Royal Navy personnel of the Iraq War